The Anthony Yelverton House is a historic house located at 39 Maple Avenue Highland, Ulster County, New York.

Description and history 
It is a -story, three-bay wide frame structure built about 1754. It is built into the hillside. It features a two-story porch spanning the full width of the building. It is the only surviving structure from "Yelverton's Landing", and once served as a tavern, storehouse, and private residence.

Anthony Yelverton was a Poughkeepsie businessman. From this building and adjacent sawmill, Yelverton developed the area called both Yelverton's Landing and New Paltz Landing because a road connected it to New Paltz, further west. It became both a community in its own right and a Hudson River "port" for commerce from the New Paltz area.

It was listed on the National Register of Historic Places on September 22, 1983.

References

Houses on the National Register of Historic Places in New York (state)
Houses in Ulster County, New York
National Register of Historic Places in Ulster County, New York